Adivare is a village in Ratnagiri district in the state of Maharashtra, India.The village is administrated by a Sarpanch who is an elected representative of village as per constitution of India and Panchayati raj (India).

References

External links
 Villages in Ratnagiri district

Villages in Ratnagiri district